Brunei and Qatar established diplomatic relations in 1991. Brunei has an embassy in Doha, and Qatar has an embassy in Bandar Seri Begawan.

History 
Relations between the two countries has been established since 2 October 1991. Brunei opened its embassy in Qatar in 2001 while Qatar opened its embassy in Brunei in 2008.

Economic relations 
Two memorandum of understanding such as cultural and education co-operation including two agreements on avoidance of double taxation and commercial and technical co-operation between both countries government has been signed to further strengthen ties between the two countries. There is also a co-operation in sport between the two countries. Currently, there are a small number of Bruneian expatriates in Qatar who are mainly engineers and technicians working with Qatargas and QatarEnergy.

Further reading 
 Kerjasama Brunei - Qatar pelbagai bidang (in Malay)

References 

Qatar
Bilateral relations of Qatar